Federal Highway 135 (Carretera Federal 135) is a Federal Highway of Mexico. The highway travels from Tehuacán, Puebla in the north to San Francisco Telixtlahuaca-San Pablo Huitzo, Oaxaca in the south.

References

135